Sven Boy (born 2 October 1976) is a German football coach and former footballer who most recently was in charge of VfR Neumünster.

References

External links
 

1976 births
Living people
German footballers
Holstein Kiel players
VfL Bochum players
Arminia Bielefeld players
SpVgg Greuther Fürth players
VfB Lübeck players
Eintracht Braunschweig players
VfL Wolfsburg II players
2. Bundesliga players
3. Liga players
Association football defenders
Holstein Kiel II players